A late model car is a car which has been recently designed or manufactured, often the latest model. (An early model car or classic car is a car old enough to be of historical interest; there is no usual intermediate term.)

The precise definition of "late model" varies.

Racing

Late model race cars are the highest class of local stock car racing vehicles at many race tracks in the United States and Canada. Some regional and lower national-level series race in late models. Varieties of late models (ranked from the highest vehicle performance to lowest) include super late models, late models, and limited late models. Some series require crate motors to be utilized by racecars under their sanction, which often utilize GM 604 engines. Vehicles raced on dirt tracks are significantly different from vehicles raced on asphalt.

Super late models are the premier divisions of asphalt short track racing in the United States and Canada. Most bodies are coupes constructed from fiberglass and conform to the 2002 approved body configuration agreement. This standard, along with the widespread use of this style of racecar, allows teams to not only compete at local tracks but also to travel throughout the country, hitting major events nationwide. Notable big-money super late model races include the Kern County Classic at Kern County Raceway in California, Summer Showdown in Evergreen Speedway, the Oxford 250 in Oxford, the All American 400 in Nashville, and the Snowball Derby in Pensacola.

Late model stock cars are a product of the Carolinas and are the premier class raced at local and regional tracks in the Mid-Atlantic region of the United States. The power plants produce over 400 horsepower underneath a fiberglass body built to withstand the rigors of short track racing without the weight of stock body panels. Some of the larger late model stock car events include the ValleyStar Credit Union 300 at Martinsville Speedway, the Myrtle Beach 400 at Myrtle Beach Speedway, and the Denny Hamlin Short Track Showdown, a celebrity charity race held at local short tracks in Virginia, most recently held at Langley Speedway (Virginia).

Asphalt late model racing is a common stepping stone for drivers who race in regional and national touring series, including NASCAR. Racers of both dirt and asphalt late models have won the national championship of the NASCAR Whelen All-American Series.

Almost every NASCAR Cup Series driver raced in the class while progressing their career, and many crew chiefs have also developed through this level.  Many often run in late model classes during off-weeks or special races, while some drivers who did not advance through this level (such as Juan Pablo Montoya) have since raced a late model. For example, in 2007, Montoya raced the Prelude to the Dream at Eldora Speedway, a charity event with NASCAR Cup and other notable drivers.

Late model-type cars are also prevalent as a form of cost-cutting in road racing.  As many of these oval-track cars can be adjusted to become road race cars with weight balance changes, the SCCA has listed them in the GT America category, and with the affordability of a late model stock car in the category ($30,000 cars with specification engines, and frequently purchased used NASCAR wheels), these cars are prevalent in club racing.  Similar rules are used in SCCA Trans-Am TA2 class racing, where the same chassis builders for Super Late Models provide chassis for TA2.

Dirt track late model racing also takes place in Australia. The Australian Late Model Championship has been a feature on the Australian speedway calendar since 2002.

Late model cars can also be seen in simulators such as iRacing.

United States national touring series

Asphalt
 American Canadian Tour
 ARCA Midwest Tour
 CRA Super Series
 CARS Tour
 Northwest Super Late Model Series
 Pro All Stars Series
 Southern Super Series
 SRL Southwest Tour Series

Dirt
 Lucas Oil Late Model Dirt Series
 World of Outlaws Late Model Series
 XR Super Series
 MARS Dirt Car Series

Canadian touring series

Asphalt
 CASCAR Super Series
 APC United Late Model Series
 Maritime Pro Stock Tour
 Ontario Sportsman Series
 Quebec Sportsman Series

See also

 National Dirt Late Model Hall of Fame, a United States hall of fame for dirt track late model racers
 Australian Late Model Championship

References

Auto racing by type